The Colorado River Board of California is a state agency in the U.S. state of California that represents California in discussions and negotiations regarding the Colorado River and its management.

The Colorado River Board of California's mission is "To protect the interests and rights of the state of California, its agencies, and citizens, in the water and power resources of the Colorado River".  Its current agenda can be found on its website.

History
The Colorado River Board of California (CRB) was established in 1937 by state statute.  Administratively it falls under the California Natural Resources Agency.

Membership
The CRB consists of eight members appointed by the Governor: representatives of the six California local water agencies that originally held Colorado River water rights, two public members, as well as the Director of Water Resources and the Director of Fish and Game or their designees. The six local water agencies are: Palo Verde Irrigation District, Imperial Irrigation District, Coachella Valley Water District, Metropolitan Water District of Southern California, San Diego County Water Authority, and the Los Angeles Department of Water and Power.

The Governor appoints the six agency representatives as follows:

Activities
The CRB works with: the six local California water agencies, the Colorado River Basin states (Arizona, California, Colorado, Nevada, New Mexico, Utah, and Wyoming), federal agencies, other state agencies, Congress, and the courts. Activities include analyses of engineering, legal and economic matters concerning the Colorado River resources of the seven basin states and the 1944 United States-Mexico Water Treaty obligation to deliver Colorado River water to Mexico.

Budget
The CRB is currently funded 100% by reimbursements from the six agencies.

References

External links 
 Colorado River Board of California official web site

Colorado River
California Natural Resources Agency
State agencies of California
Water in California
Water management authorities in the United States
Government agencies established in 1937
1937 establishments in California